The Patriarchal Exarchate in Western Europe (PEWE) is an exarchate created by the Russian Orthodox Church (ROC) on 28 December 2018.

The primate of the PEWE is Metropolitan Anthony (Sevryuk) who holds the title of "Metropolitan of Chersonesus and Western Europe".

History

1945-1991 
On September 7, 1945, by the decision of the Holy Synod of the ROC, The Western European Exarchate of the Moscow Patriarchate was established, headed by Metropolitan Eulogius (Georgievsky), then seriously ill. On the death of the latter on August 8, 1946 by decision of the Synod and the decree of Patriarch Alexius I of Moscow, Metropolitan Seraphim (Lukyanov) was appointed new Exarch of Western Europe. However, in France, almost the entire clergy and flock of Metropolitan Eulogy wished to remain under the jurisdiction of the Patriarchate of Constantinople.

From 1947 to 1989 a quarterly journal, the "Herald Of the Russian Patriarchal Exarchate", was published in Paris.

Throughout the postwar period until the early 1990s, the situation of the communities of the Russian Orthodox Church in Western Europe was difficult: Augustine Roberts, one of the priests, wrote to Patriarch Alexius I in 1956: "in most Western European countries, belonging to the jurisdiction of  Moscow is a difficult matter. We seem politically suspicious to our Orthodox and non-Orthodox brothers, and many people who are interested in Orthodoxy as such do not want to have anything to do with the "Soviet" Church, that is, the "bolshevik" one. Our pastoral and missionary work suffers from the fact that we belong to this jurisdiction. The isolation of the Russian Church in the West is catastrophic for the whole future of Orthodoxy in the West".

In 1960, the Diocese of Chersonesus was established with its center in Paris; in 1962, the Diocese of Sourozh was established with its center in London. The Diocese of The Hague was established in 1972.

The Council of bishops of the Russian Orthodox Church on January 30 — 31, 1990, among others overseas Exarchates of the Russian Orthodox Church, abolished the Western European Exarchate. Its dioceses were directly subjected to the Moscow Patriarch and the Holy Synod of the Russian Orthodox Church.

Background 
On 27 November 2018 the synod of the Ecumenical Patriarchate decided to dissolve the Archdiocese of Russian Orthodox churches in Western Europe (AROCWE) "thereby entrusting its faithful to the Hierarchs of the Ecumenical Throne in Europe". This decision was made without any official requests from the hierarchs of the AROCWE and caused confusion. On 15 December Pastoral Assembly of AROCWE decided to call an extraordinary General Assembly, scheduled for 23 February 2019. This General Assembly will discuss the decision of the Ecumenical Patriarchate to dissolve the AROCWE. ROC officials responded with a reminder of the 2003 proposal of Alexy II to the AROCWE to move to the Moscow Patriarchate.

On 29 November, after the synod of the Ecumenical Patriarchate had ended, the same communiqué which had been released one day prior concerning the Ecumenical Patriarchate's decision to dissolve the AROCWE was released, in French, on the official website of the Ecumenical Patriarchate. The Ecumenical Patriarchate "never explicitly justified" its decision to dissolve the AROCWE.

On 30 November, the council of the AROCWE declared in a communiqué that this decision of the Ecumenical Patriarchate was "unforeseen". The communiqué added that since the AROCWE had not requested this decision, two things should be done before the AROCWE would comply to this decision: the primate of the AROCWE Archbishop , as the head of the AROCWE, will have to "invite the priests of the Archdiocese to a pastoral assembly, on December 15, 2018, to discuss with those who carry with him the spiritual responsibility of the parishes and faithful of the Archdiocese" and the AROCWE council will have to "convene a general assembly of the Archdiocese, in which all the clergy and lay delegates elected by the parishes and communities, which are the adherent associations of the Diocesan Union, will take part." The communiqué concluded that since John of Charioupolis had not requested this decision, he still remained fully in pastoral charge of the Russian Orthodox Churches in Western Europe.

Creation of the PEWE 

On 28 December 2018, in response to the Ecumenical Patriarchate's actions in Ukraine, the Holy Synod of the Russian Orthodox Church decided to create "a Patriarchal Exarchate in Western Europe with the center in Paris" whose "pastoral sphere of responsibility includes" Andorra, Belgium, the United Kingdom, Ireland, Spain, Italy, Liechtenstein, Luxembourg, the Principality of Monaco, the Netherlands, Portugal, France, and Switzerland. During the same synod, the decision was also taken to create "a diocese of the Russian Orthodox Church in Spain and Portugal with the center in Madrid" as well as "a Patriarchal Exarchate in South-East Asia [PESEA] with the center in Singapore." On the same day, in an interview with Russia-24 channel, Metropolitan Hilarion, head of the Synodal Department for External Church Relations of the ROC, declared the ROC "will now act as if they [Constantinople] do not exist at all because our purpose is missionary, our task is to educate, we are creating these structures for ministerial care about our flock, there can be no such deterring factors here", and that the ROC will take charge of the Eastern Orthodox faithfuls of its diaspora instead of the Ecumenical Patriarchate.

Before that, the Diocese of Chersonesus was taking charge of the Orthodox communities of the Moscow Patriarchate in France, Switzerland, Portugal and Spain.

The person chosen to be the primate of the PEWE as well as of the Russian Orthodox Diocese of Chersonesus was Bishop John (Roschchin) of Bogorodsk. Bishop John was granted the title of "of Chersonesus and Western Europe". Bishop John was granted the title of Metropolitan on 3 January 2019 by Patriarch Kirill at Moscow's Dormition Cathedral.

Metropolitan Anthony as ruling bishop 
On 30 May 2019, the Holy Synod of the ROC decided to appoint archbishop Anthony (Sevryuk) of Vienna and Budapest as primate of the PEWE and of the diocese of Chersonesus. At the same time, John (Roshchin), who was until then the primate of the PEWE and of the diocese of Chersonesus, was appointed as primate of the ROC diocese of Vienna and Budapest to replace archbishop Anthony.

On 31 May 2019, archbishop Anthony was consecrated metropolitan because of his appointment as exarch of the PEWE.

The nomination of Anthony as primate of the PEWE on 30 May 2019 was, according to Novaya Gazeta, related to the fact that Anthony would be negotiating the integration of the AROCWE into the Moscow Patriarchate.

On December 4, 2019, the first meeting of the Synod of the Patriarchal Exarchate of Western Europe took place in the building of the Korsun Diocesan Administration in Paris.

Structure 
Since 26 February 2019, the PEWE is divided into 6 dioceses:

 Diocese of Chersonesus (Liechtenstein, Monaco, France, Switzerland), always headed by the primate of the PEWE
 (Belgium, Luxembourg)
 Diocese of The Hague (the Netherlands)
Diocese of Spain-Portugal (Andorra, Spain, Portugal)
 Diocese of Sourozh (United Kingdom, Ireland)
 The parishes of the Russian Orthodox Church in Italy (Italy, Malta, San Marino)

Exarchs 
 Eulogius (Georgiyevsky) (September 2, 1945 - August 8, 1946)
 Seraphim (Lukyanov) (August 9, 1946 - November 15, 1949)
 Photius (Topiro)	(February 1950 - October 26, 1951)
 Boris (Vik) (October 26, 1951 - November 11, 1954)
 Nicholas (Yeryomin) (November 11, 1954 - January 14, 1963)
 Anthony (Bloom) (January 14, 1963 - April 5, 1974)
 Nikodim (Rotov) (September 3, 1974 - September 5, 1978)
 Philaret (Vakhromeyev) (October 12, 1978 - February 1, 1984)
 Vladimir (Sabodan) (March 28, 1984 - February 19, 1990)
Exarchate abolished (1990-2018)
 John (Roshchin) (28 December 2018-30 May 2019)
 Anthony (Sevryuk) (30 May 2019-)

See also 

 Archdiocese of Russian Orthodox churches in Western Europe
 Serbian Orthodox Eparchy of Western Europe
 Patriarchal Exarchate in South-East Asia – exarchate of the Russian Orthodox Church created for the same reasons and during the same synod

References

External links 

Information about the PEWE on the official website of the ROC

Western Europe
Western Europe

Eastern Orthodoxy in Belgium
Eastern Orthodoxy in France
Eastern Orthodoxy in Italy
Eastern Orthodoxy in Ireland
Eastern Orthodoxy in the Netherlands
Eastern Orthodoxy in Portugal
Eastern Orthodoxy in Spain
Eastern Orthodoxy in Switzerland
Eastern Orthodoxy in the United Kingdom

Russian diaspora in France

2018 establishments in Europe
Christian organizations established in 2018